The Fengning Pumped Storage Power Station is a pumped-storage hydroelectric power station about  northwest of Chengde in Fengning Manchu Autonomous County of Hebei Province, China. Construction on the power station began in June 2013 and the first generator was commissioned in 2019, the last in 2021. Project cost was US$1.87 billion. On 1 April 2014 Gezhouba Group was awarded the main contract to build the power station. It will be constructed in two 1,800 MW phases. It was completed in late 2021, and became the largest pumped-storage power station in the world with an installed capacity of 3,600 MW.

Water from the upper reservoir is sent to the underground power station down near the lower reservoir.

See also

List of pumped-storage power stations

References

Dams in China
Pumped-storage hydroelectric power stations in China
Hydroelectric power stations in Hebei
Dams under construction in China
Buildings and structures under construction in China
Underground power stations